Perczel is a Hungarian surname.

Perczel may refer to:
András Perczel (b. 1959), Hungarian biochemist and professor at the Hungarian Academy of Sciences
Béla Perczel (1819–1888), Hungarian politician who served as Minister of Justice between 1875 and 1878
Dezső Perczel (1848–1913), Hungarian politician who served as Interior Minister between 1895 and 1899
Miklós Perczel (1812–1904), Hungarian military officer in the Revolution of 1848 and colonel in the American Civil War
Mór Perczel (1811–1899), Hungarian leader and general in the Revolution of 1848